The 1937 TCU Horned Frogs football team represented Texas Christian University (TCU) in the 1937 college football season. The team was coached by Dutch Meyer in his fourth year as head coach, finishing the season 4–4–2 (3–1–2 SWC). The offense scored 89 points while the defense allowed 72 points. The Frogs played their home games in Amon G. Carter Stadium, which is located on campus in Fort Worth, Texas.

Schedule

Team players drafted into the NFL
Ki Aldrich and Davey O'Brien were selected in the 1939 NFL Draft.

References

TCU
TCU Horned Frogs football seasons
TCU Horned Frogs football